Carlos José Castilho (November 27, 1927 – February 2, 1987) was a Brazilian football goalkeeper. He was born in Rio de Janeiro and played for Fluminense from 1947 to 1964 and for Brazil. He was a member of the Brazil squad in four World Cups: 1950, 1954, 1958 and 1962, but he only actually played three games, all of them in the 1954 finals.

He was noted as a goalkeeper for making seemingly impossible saves. Due to his good luck, his opponents' supporters called him "Leiteria" (lucky man) and Fluminense supporters called him "Saint Castilho".

He was daltonic and he believed he was favored because he saw yellow balls as if they were red, though he had trouble at night with white balls.

During his career he appeared in 699 games for Fluminense, a club record. With Fluminense, he won 420 games, conceded 777 goals, and kept 255 clean-sheets; all individual records in Fluminense history.

After his retirement from playing sport, he coached many teams from Brazil.

He committed suicide on February 2, 1987.

Honours 
Fluminense
 Campeonato Carioca: 1951, 1959, 1964
Torneio Rio – São Paulo: 1957, 1960
Copa Rio: 1952
Paysandu
 Campeonato Paraense: 1965
Brazil
 World Cup: 1958, 1962

References

External links 
 

1927 births
1987 suicides
Footballers from Rio de Janeiro (city)
Brazilian footballers
Brazilian football managers
Suicides in Brazil
Brazil international footballers
Association football goalkeepers
1950 FIFA World Cup players
1954 FIFA World Cup players
1958 FIFA World Cup players
1962 FIFA World Cup players
Campeonato Brasileiro Série A players
Campeonato Brasileiro Série A managers
Olaria Atlético Clube players
Fluminense FC players
Paysandu Sport Club players
FIFA World Cup-winning players
Esporte Clube Vitória managers
Sport Club Internacional managers
Guarani FC managers
Grêmio Foot-Ball Porto Alegrense managers
Santos FC managers
Sociedade Esportiva Palmeiras managers
Suicides by jumping in Brazil
1987 deaths